The Week was a radical British newspaper from 1933 until 1941.

Marxist journalist Claud Cockburn launched the first British publication known as The Week as a newsletter in the spring of 1933, after he had returned from reporting on Germany. It focused on the rise of fascism. Jessica Mitford attributed the journal's influence to its use of undercover sources. It ceased publication in 1941.

In the late 1930s, The Week was highly critical of Neville Chamberlain and his policy of appeasement. Cockburn maintained in the 1960s that much of the information in The Week was leaked to him by  Sir Robert Vansittart, the Permanent Under-Secretary of the Foreign Office. 

At the same time, Cockburn claimed that MI5 was spying on him because of The Week; but the British historian D.C. Watt argued that it was more likely that, if anyone was spying on Cockburn, it was the Special Branch of Scotland Yard who were less experienced in this work than MI5. Cockburn was an opponent of appeasement before the Molotov–Ribbentrop Pact. In a 1937 article in The Week, Cockburn coined the term Cliveden set to describe what he alleged to be an upper-class pro-German group that exercised influence behind the scenes. The Week ceased publication shortly after the war began. 

Watt alleges that the information printed in The Week included rumours, some of which suited Moscow's interests. Watt used as an example the claim The Week made in February–March 1939 that German troops were concentrating in Klagenfurt for an invasion of Yugoslavia, which Watt says had no basis in reality.

References

 

News magazines published in the United Kingdom
Defunct political magazines published in the United Kingdom
English-language magazines
Magazines established in 1933
Magazines disestablished in 1941
Marxist magazines
United Kingdom in World War II